Donji Korićani is a village in the municipalities of Travnik and Kneževo, Bosnia and Herzegovina.

Demographics 
According to the 2013 census, its population was 99, all Serbs in the Travnik part and 84 of them in the Kneževo part.

References

Populated places in Travnik